Jean Strunc (born 17 June 1911, date of death unknown) was a French racewalker. He competed in the men's 50 kilometres walk at the 1952 Summer Olympics.

References

1911 births
Year of death missing
Athletes (track and field) at the 1952 Summer Olympics
French male racewalkers
Olympic athletes of France
Place of birth missing